Jumping is a form of locomotion or movement in which an organism or non-living (e.g., robotic) mechanical system propels itself through the air along a ballistic trajectory.

Jump or Jumping also may refer to:

Places
 Jump, Kentucky or Jump Station, an unincorporated community in Floyd County
 Jump, Ohio, a community in Hardin County
 Jump, South Yorkshire, a village in Barnsley, England

Science and engineering
 Jump discontinuity, a change in value of a mathematical function
 Jump, a step in a statistical jump process
 Jump, a step in a jump diffusion process
 Hydraulic jump, a phenomenon in fluid dynamics

Computing
 Jump instruction, used to alter the control flow of a program
 JumpDrive, a brand of, or a generic term for, USB flash drives
 Turing jump, an operator in recursion theory

Media
 Jump (magazine line), a line of manga magazines
 Weekly Shōnen Jump, the best-selling magazine of the line, often referred to as just Jump
 Jump (musical), a Korean comedic theatrical performance involving martial arts, acrobatics, and dance moves

Film
 Jump (1999 film), a 1999 film featuring James LeGros, Mark Rosenthal and Jessica Hecht
 Jump (2009 film), a 2009 Hong Kong comedy-drama film
 Jump (2012 film), a 2012 Northern Irish film
 Jump! (film), a 2007 film featuring Patrick Swayze and Martine McCutcheon
 Jumping (film), a 1986 Belgian film
 Jump In!, a 2007 Disney Channel film
 Jump cut, a technique used in film editing
 The Jump (2020 film), a 2020 Lithuanian documentary film

Television
 Jump! (TV series), a Singaporean Chinese drama
 "Jump" (Ugly Betty), the season 2 finale episode of Ugly Betty
 "Jumping", an episode of the television series Teletubbies
 The Jump (1998 TV series), British crime drama
 The Jump (2014 TV series), British television series that follows celebrities as they tried to master various winter sports
 The Jump (ESPN talk show), basketball talk show (2016–2021)

Music
 Jump blues, a musical genre
 Jump Incorporated, an Australian rock band
 Jump Records, a record label
 Jumpstyle, a genre in electronic music
 Jump or Jump, Little Children, an American indie rock band
 Jamshid "Jumps" Khadiwhala, turntablist for The Cat Empire
 Jump! (album), by Van Dyke Parks
 Jump (Jimmy Ponder album), 1989
 Jump (Djumbo album), 2005
 Jumping (EP), by Kara
 The Jump (podcast), a music podcast hosted by Shirley Manson

Songs
 "Jump" (Every Little Thing song), 2001
 "Jump" (Flo Rida song) with Nelly Furtado, 2009, from R.O.O.T.S. 
 "Jump" (David Guetta and Glowinthedark song), 2019
 "Jump" (Kris Kross song), 1992
 "Jump" (Madonna song), 2005, from Confessions on a Dance Floor
 "Jump" (Nadav Guedj song), 2015, from Nadav Guedj
 "Jump" (Rihanna song), 2012, from Unapologetic
 "Jump" (Van Halen song), 1983
 "Jump (For My Love)", a 1984 song by The Pointer Sisters (later covered by Girls Aloud)
 "Jump, Jump", a 2005 single by DJ Tomekk from Numma Eyns
 "Jumpin'" (Liberty X song), 2003, from Being Somebody
 "Jumping" (Kara song), 2010
 "Jumpin' Jumpin, a 1999 song by Destiny's Child
 "Jump", 2013, by Gary Barlow from Since I Saw You Last
 "Jump", 2020, by Dababy from Blame It on Baby
 "Jump", 2005, by The Faders
 "Jump", 1984, by Claire Hamill from Touchpaper
 "Jump", 1981, by Loverboy from Get Lucky
 "Jump", 2018, by MadeinTYO from Sincerely, Tokyo
 "Jump", 2017, by Major Lazer from Know No Better
 "Jump", 1997, by Kylie Minogue from Impossible Princess
 "Jump!", 1992, by The Movement
 "Jump", 2004, by N*E*R*D from Fly or Die
 "Jump", 2004, by Simple Plan from Still Not Getting Any...
 "Jump", 1983, by XTC, B-side to Wonderland

Sports
 BASE jumping, parachuting or wingsuit flying from a fixed structure or cliff
 Figure skating jumps, an element of competitive figure skating disciplines
 Jumping (horse), a major element of many equestrian sports
 Show jumping, or stadium jumping, the competitive equestrian event
 High jump, a track and field event over a horizontal bar
 Jump rope, where one or more participants jump over a rope swung so that it passes under their feet and over their heads
 Long jump, a track and field event
 Triple jump, a track and field event
 Vertical jump, a power and endurance exercise, commonly used to measure the power output of athletes

Science fiction
 Jump drive, a speculative invention in science fiction, a method of traveling through hyperspace
 Jump (Alliance–Union universe), a fictional faster-than-light technology
 J.U.M.P., a fictional weapon in the G.I. Joe universe

Other uses
 Jump (surname), a surname
 Jump Associates, a design strategy firm based in San Mateo, California
 Jump Bikes, a dockless electric bicycle-sharing system available in many countries; it belongs to Lime (transportation company)
 JUMP (Join Us to Motivate People), an International Association for the Exchange of Students for Technical Experience seminar
 Jump Trading, a high-frequency and algorithmic proprietary trading firm
 A sudden violent assault of a person

See also
 Jump River (disambiguation)
 Jumpy (disambiguation)
 Jump start (disambiguation)
 JMP (disambiguation)